Jamshoro Power Station (GENCO-I) is a thermal power plant fueled by natural gas and fuel oil located in Jamshoro near Hyderabad, Sindh in Pakistan. It is operated by the Jamshoro Power Company. It was commissioned between 1989 and 1991 under the leadership of the engineer A.K. Siddiqui and the project director and engineer M. M. Chandio. It consists of one 250 MW unit and three 200 MW units.

In February 2014, the Asian Development Bank agreed to loan $900 million to the government of Pakistan for a project to install a 600MW supercritical coal-fired power plant at Jamshoro. The Islamic Development Bank (IDB) approved $220 million for the Jamshoro Coal Power generation project. The Asian Development Bank had already approved $900m for the project, whereas $380m was to be contributed by the government to meet the overall estimated project cost of $1.5 billion.

The 600MW supercritical coal-fired power generation plant, using an 80/20 blend of imported sub-bituminous coal and domestic lignite when available, will accord with international and national environmental standards.

See also 

List of power stations in Pakistan
List of electric supply companies in Pakistan

References

External links 

Water and Power Development Authority
Company website

Jamshoro District
Natural gas-fired power stations in Pakistan
Generation companies
Water and Power Development Authority